Pei Xingru (born 11 October 1998) is a Chinese freestyle wrestler. She won the gold medal in the women's 60 kg event at the 2016 World Wrestling Championships held in Budapest, Hungary. She also won one of the bronze medals both in the women's 59 kg event in 2018 and in the women's 59 kg event in 2019.

Career 

At the 2014 Summer Youth Olympics held in Nanjing, China, she won the silver medal in the girls' 60 kg event. In the final, she lost against Grace Bullen of Norway.

In 2017, she won the gold medal in the women's 58 kg event at the Asian Indoor and Martial Arts Games held in Ashgabat, Turkmenistan. The following year, she won the gold medal in the women's 57 kg event at the 2018 Asian Wrestling Championships held in Bishkek, Kyrgyzstan. In the same month, she also competed in the women's freestyle event as part of the 2018 Wrestling World Cup. Later that year, she won the silver medal in the women's 57 kg event at the 2018 Asian Games held in Jakarta and Palembang, Indonesia. In the final, she lost against Jong Myong-suk of North Korea.

Major results

References

External links 
 

Living people
1998 births
Place of birth missing (living people)
Chinese female sport wrestlers
Asian Wrestling Championships medalists
World Wrestling Championships medalists
World Wrestling Champions
Wrestlers at the 2014 Summer Youth Olympics
Asian Games medalists in wrestling
Wrestlers at the 2018 Asian Games
Asian Games silver medalists for China
Medalists at the 2018 Asian Games
21st-century Chinese women